Chamaita fissa is a moth of the subfamily Arctiinae. It was described by Karel Černý in 2009.

References

Nudariina
Moths described in 2009